Fossum is a Norwegian surname. Notable people with the surname include:

Casey Fossum (born 1978), American baseball player
Eric Fossum (born 1957), American professor and inventor
Iver Fossum (born 1996), Norwegian association footballer
Jon Fossum (1923–2007), Norwegian politician for the Conservative Party
Karin Fossum (born 1954), Norwegian author
Marita Fossum (born 1965), Norwegian author
Michael E. Fossum (born 1957), American astronaut
Per Fossum (1910–2004), Norwegian alpine skier who competed in the 1936 Winter Olympics
Sindre Fossum Beyer (born 1977), Norwegian politician for the Labour Party
Thor Fossum (1916–1993), Norwegian politician
Tryggve Fossum, Norwegian computer architect

Norwegian-language surnames